The individual moving bird at 33 metres event was part of the archery programme at the 1920 Summer Olympics.  The event, like all other archery events in 1920, was open only to men.  Only two archers competed.

Results

References

Sources
 
 

Archery at the 1920 Summer Olympics